Tomasz Salamoński (born October 10, 1973 in Wąsosz) is a retired Polish footballer.

External links
 

1973 births
Living people
Polish footballers
Zagłębie Lubin players
Górnik Polkowice players
People from Góra County
Sportspeople from Lower Silesian Voivodeship
Association football midfielders